Cyclone is an unincorporated community in Jackson Township, Clinton County, Indiana.

History
The town's name commemorates a destructive tornado that struck the area on June 14, 1880.  A 1913 county history states,
[It was] the most destructive storm that ever visited the county, either since its settlement or in traditional history.  It was a genuine cyclone with a "funnel shaped cloud," which swept over a curved path of over forty miles in this and adjoining counties, leaving desolation in its wake.  It was estimated to have done $200,000 damage in this county.  The present town, which was located about that time as a railroad station, was in the path of the storm and was named for it.

A post office was established at Cyclone in 1883, and remained in operation until it was discontinued in 1933.

Geography

References

Unincorporated communities in Clinton County, Indiana
Unincorporated communities in Indiana